Julián Hernández Santillán (born 6 April 1963 in Nuevo León) is a Mexican politician affiliated with the National Action Party (PAN). Hernández Santillán has served in the lower house of the Mexican Congress.  In the 2006 Nuevo León state election he was elected local deputy to serve in the Congress of Nuevo León from 2006 to 2009.  He is the current leader of the PAN faction in the Congress.

References 

1963 births
Living people
National Action Party (Mexico) politicians
Politicians from Nuevo León
Members of the Chamber of Deputies (Mexico)
Members of the Congress of Nuevo León
21st-century Mexican politicians